Irregular, unauthorized, or undocumented migration is the practice of crossing an international border without official permission from the authorities. Irregular migration is not synonymous with illegal immigration because irregular travel in order to seek asylum is not a crime. According to the European Commission, "the term 'illegal migration' should be avoided, as most irregular migrants are not criminals. Being in a country without the required papers is, in most countries, not a criminal offence but an administrative infringement". In 1993, the UK House of Lords ruled that an asylum seeker who had forged papers in order to enter the UK had not entered the country illegally.

References

Human migration